The 1941 Miami Redskins football team was an American football team that represented Miami University as an independent during the 1941 college football season. In their tenth and final season under head coach Frank Wilton, the Redskins compiled a 2–7 record. The team played its home games at Miami Field in Oxford, Ohio.

Schedule

References

Miami
Miami RedHawks football seasons
Miami Redskins football